Kentaro Sekimoto (関本賢太郎, born August 26, 1978) is a Japanese former professional baseball infielder in Japan's Nippon Professional Baseball. He played with the Hanshin Tigers in 2000 and from 2002 to 2015.

External links

NPB stats

1978 births
Living people
Baseball people from Aichi Prefecture
Japanese baseball players
Hanshin Tigers players
Nippon Professional Baseball infielders